Ihor Cherkun (17 February 1965 – 24 September 2021) was a Soviet and Ukrainian football defensive player and coach.

Career
Born in Melitopol, Cherkun was a product of Metalurh Zaporizhzhia youth sportive school system. His first trainer was Viktor Leyner. In 1981, under coach Oleksandr Tomakh, he began to play for Metalurh's double team. He started playing in the attack, later due to his tall stature he was transferred to the position of defender. In 1984 he was drafted into the army. For five months he served in the motorized infantry unit in Mykolayiv, during the service he played in the championship of the division, where he was spotted and transferred to Simferopol, where he got into the double of the local "Tavria". However, after the appointment of Anatoliy Konkov as the club's coach, the servicemen stopped being involved in the main team, and Cherkun played the rest of the service at an amateur level.

After demobilization he returned to Zaporozhzhia and played in the local teams. As part of Torpedo Zaporizhzhia Cherkun held the first championship of independent Ukraine. He made his debut in the Vyshcha Liha on 7 March 1992, appearing in the starting line-up in an away match against Tavriya Simferopol.

After retirement from playing career, he worked as children football trainer.

References

External links
 Profile at Official UAF website (in Ukrainian)
 Profile at footballfacts.ru (in Russian)

1965 births
2021 deaths
People from Melitopol
Ukrainian footballers
Soviet footballers
Association football defenders
Soviet Top League players
Ukrainian Premier League players
SC Tavriya Simferopol players
FC Torpedo Zaporizhzhia players
FC Metalurh Zaporizhzhia players
FC Viktor Zaporizhzhia players
FC Zirka Kropyvnytskyi players
Ukrainian football managers
Sportspeople from Zaporizhzhia Oblast